The 1953 VFL Grand Final was an Australian rules football game contested between the Geelong Football Club and Collingwood Football Club, held at the Melbourne Cricket Ground on 26 September 1953. It was the 56th annual Grand Final of the Victorian Football League, staged to determine the premiers for the 1953 VFL season. The match, attended by 89,149 spectators, was won by Collingwood by 12 points, the club's 12th premiership victory.

This was the third successive Grand Final appearance for the Cats, who were attempting to win three successive flags after having defeated Essendon in the 1951 VFL Grand Final and Collingwood in the 1952 VFL Grand Final. Collingwood had not won a premiership since winning the 1936 VFL Grand Final.

In round 14 of the 1953 season, Collingwood defeated Geelong to end their record 23 game winning streak (26 games unbeaten). Collingwood won again when the sides battled in the Semi Final, and in the Grand Final defeated Geelong for the third time in the year. Geelong had the better of the final quarter, but inaccuracy cost them.

Collingwood's full-back Jack Hamilton and Geelong's dual premiership player Russell Middlemiss missed the game through injury.

Teams